Gwilt is a surname. Notable people with the name include:
Ayesha Gwilt (born 1989), English actress
George Gwilt (1746—1807), "George Gwilt the Elder", English architect
George Gwilt the younger (1775—1856), English architect and writer on architecture
James Gwilt  (born 1986), Australian rules footballer
Joseph Gwilt  (1784—1863), English architect and writer
Martin Gwilt Jolley (1859—1916), English painter
Warren Harley Gwilt (born 1986), South African writer

Surnames